On Vacation was The Robot Ate Me's third album, released in 2004 by the band's frontman, Ryland Bouchard's label Swim Slowly Records, then reissued in 2005 by 5 Rue Christine. It contains the song Oh No! Oh My!, from which the band Oh No! Oh My! got their name.

Track listing

Disc one
"The Genocide Ball"
"Jesus And Hitler"
"The Republican Army"
"Oh No! Oh My! (1994)"
"Crispy Christian Tea Time"
"You Don't Fill Me Up The Same"
"I Slept Through The Holocaust"
"Every Nazi Plane Has A Cross"  
"On Vacation"

Disc two
"On Vacation"
"Watermelon Sugar"
"Apricot Tea"   
"The Red-Haired Girl"
"Pre-Party 94"
"Oh No! Oh My!"   
"The Tourist" 
"I'm Ok"

Members
Ryland Bouchard (Vocals)
RJ Hoffman (Bass and Violin)
Dave Greenberg (Drums)

References
Stylus Magazine Review

2005 albums
The Robot Ate Me albums
5 Rue Christine albums